Thomas Gaddis (1742–1834) was a militia officer in the American Revolutionary War. He was born December 28, 1742, in Winchester, Frederick County, Virginia and married Hannah Rice in 1764; the same year he built Fort Gaddis, a refuge from the Indians, located on the Catawba Trail. In fact, Pennsylvania and Virginia had conflicting claims in the area Gaddis settled. Though he maintained his loyalty to Virginia, Gaddis also protected his investment by recording his patent with Pennsylvania authorities. By 1773, both states created new geo-political boundaries in recognition of increased white settlement. Pennsylvania formed Westmoreland County out of the larger Bedford County, and Virginia established the District of West Augusta. In 1776, West Augusta was further divided into three counties: Ohio, Yohogania, and Monongalia, where Gaddis and his family resided.

Thomas Gaddis was appointed captain of the Monongalia County militia on August 23, 1776 and by September 9th had raised a company of militia and proceeded to build what was afterwards known as Fort Liberty in Monongalia County (two miles south of present day Uniontown PA at Fort Gaddis), where they were stationed from September 1776 to January 1777. However, some historical texts have confused this fort with another Fort Liberty that was located along the Ohio River (present day West Liberty, West Virginia) and a fort located at Beech Bottom, West Virginia, about ten miles north of Fort Henry (West Virginia), which also was constructed by Gaddis and his militia company.   On February 17, 1777, Gaddis was commissioned as lieutenant colonel of Monongalia County by Patrick Henry, Governor of Virginia, and took command of Prickett's Fort, Fort Scott, Fort Stradler, Fort Jackson, and Fort Lindley. Shortly afterwards he was promoted to full colonel   

In August 1777, Gaddis and Colonel Zackquill Morgan learned that a substantial number of settlers in the Redstone area, an region south of Pittsburgh, had taken an oath of allegiance to the Monarchy of the United Kingdom and were plotting on Great Britain's behalf. Gaddis informed Lieutenant Colonel Thomas Brown at Redstone Old Fort, on the Monongahela River, requesting him to place an extra guard on the powder magazine. In a dispatch to Brown, he wrote:

The loyalists planned to seize the magazine at Redstone, but Brown mustered a guard of fifteen men, and a militia force of a hundred patriots under Gaddis and Captain Henry Enoch captured twelve tories and scattered the remainder. The prisoners were escorted to Virginia's capital in Williamsburg, took an oath of allegiance, and eventually returned home.  

With the hope of putting an end to Indian attacks on American settlers, Gaddis took part in General Lachlan McIntosh's expedition into the Ohio Country in September to December 1778, raising a company of militia to assist in the construction of Fort McIntosh and Fort Laurens, but to no avail. By the spring of 1782, however, he was a resident of Westmoreland County, Pennsylvania, his home being in that part which in 1783 became Fayette County, Pennsylvania; about three miles south of Uniontown, Pennsylvania.

Gaddis was elected a field major and third in command of the Sandusky Expedition, seeing as he was well known to many of the volunteers as a good citizen and brave soldier. At the time of his volunteering for the campaign, he was an officer of the militia of Westmoreland County. The other majors of the expedition, committed to destroying Indian towns along the Sandusky River, included David Williamson, John B. McClelland, and James Brenton.

Regretfully, the Indians and their British allies had already learned of the expedition, and the Americans were forced to retreat. During the retreat, Colonel William Crawford and several of his men, including Major John B. McClelland; William Harrison, Colonel Crawford's son-in-law; and young William Crawford, the Colonel's nephew, were captured and tortured to death. Approximately seventy Americans were killed in the 1782 campaign on the western front. Gaddis returned safely from the engagement.

On June 14, 1782, the officers dispersed to their various places of residence. Gaddis returned to that part of Westmoreland, soon to become Fayette. Afterward, he maintained his prominence in government affairs, filling honorable offices both civil and military. Aside from working as a cabinet maker, as well as owning a tavern and distillery, Gaddis was actively involved in the establishment of the Fayette County court system, serving on the first Fayette County grand jury. He was Fayette County Commissioner from 1787 to 1789, and served as a delegate for Washington, Fayette, and Allegheny County, Pennsylvania during the Whisky Insurrection.

In fact, Gaddis was the principal leader of the "Whiskey Boys," a group of citizens who were enraged that Congress had imposed a tax on whiskey in order to pay government bond holders. While smaller distilleries were to pay taxes by the gallon, larger distillers could take advantage of a flat fee, clearly putting the smaller distilleries at a disadvantage. Their dissatisfaction derived, at least in part, from the very same factors that characterized their experience leading up to the Revolutionary War; a sense of isolation and alienation from government authorities who failed to represent or consider their special needs and interests.

The excise tax, passed in July 1791, placed a burden on western farmers who converted excess grain into whiskey, which was easier to transport and much more marketable. Despite continued petitions from western counties, the United States Congress refused to repeal the excise act and westerners responded by ignoring the tax, harassing tax collectors, destroying property, and raising liberty poles. In July 1794, 7,000 local militia men organized to march on the town of Pittsburgh whose citizens they believed supported the tax. The mob was appeased with the banishment of several of the most offensive townspeople, but news of the uprising prompted George Washington to call up a 15,000-man force to march on Western Pennsylvania. By the time the troops finally approached Pittsburgh, in October, the rebel army had already dispersed. Federal officers arrested 150 men they identified as being involved in the rebellion. Of these, twenty-four were taken to Philadelphia for trial, but only two were convicted and were then given presidential pardons.

In the summer of 1794, Thomas Gaddis' home was the site of a liberty pole raising, a public protest event usually attended by a crowd of insurgents who raised a pole carrying a banner inscribed with a slogan such as "Liberty and No Excise!" Liberty poles were raised each night, along the route followed by federal troops toward Pittsburgh. Gaddis was accused of a misdemeanor, in raising a liberty pole on his farm. Most likely, his offense was covered in the general pardon by President Washington and Pennsylvania Governor, Thomas Mifflin issued to those implicated in the insurrection and who had not subsequently been indicted or convicted. The excise tax remained virtually impossible to collect in Western Pennsylvania. It was repealed by Thomas Jefferson in 1800.

Thomas Gaddis lived in Fayette County for twenty years after the Rebellion. He and his wife, Hannah, joined the Great Bethel Baptist Church in Uniontown, Pennsylvania and contributed to the building of its first church, although Gaddis was excommunicated for differing with church doctrine before the building was completed. In 1814, Gaddis sold his farm, and relocated to Union Township, Clinton County, Ohio, where he died, June 10, 1834. The original Gaddis homestead is listed on the National Register of Historic Places in Fayette County, Pennsylvania.

Notes

References

Boucher, John N. History of Westmoreland County, Pennsylvania. New York: The Lewis Publishing Company, 1906. Available Online from Google Books.
Butterfield, Consul Willshire. An Historical Account of the Expedition Against Sandusky Under Col. William Crawford in 1782. R. Clarke & Co, 1873. Available Online from Google Books.
Callahan, James Morton. History of West Virginia, Old and New, Volume 1. American Historical Society, 1923. Available Online from Google Books.
Crumrine, Boyd. History of Washington County, Pennsylvania. Philadelphia: L.H. Everts and Co., 1882. Available Online from the University of Pittsburgh Digital Research Library.
Davis Smith, Dorothy. Davis Directory of Pennsylvania: Including Hezekiah Davies Revolutionary War Pension & Philadelphia Burial Records. Davis Clearing House, 1991.
De Rosenthal, Gustavus. Journal of a Volunteer Expedition to Sandusky: From May 24 to June 13, 1782. Ayer Co Pub, 1969.
Dunn, Walter Scott. Choosing Sides on the Frontier in the American Revolution. Praeger, 2007.
Eckert, Allan. That Dark and Bloody River. Bantam Books, 1996.
Ellis, Franklin. History of Fayette County, Pennsylvania. Philadelphia: L.H. Everts and Co., 1882. Available Online from the University of Pittsburgh Digital Research Library.
Egle, Consul Willshire. An Historical Account of the Expedition Against Sandusky Under Col. William Crawford in 1782. Clarence M. Busch, 1896.
Fulton, Ray T. Fort Gaddis in Fort Necessity and Historic Shrines of the Redstone country. Fort Necessity Chapter of the Society of the Sons of the American Revolution (Uniontown, Pa), 1932. Available Online from PA's Past: Digital Bookshelf at Penn State.
Gaddis, Thomas. Pension Application of Thomas Gaddis (S4292). Transcript available Online from Southern Campaigns Revolutionary War Pension Statements & Rosters
Hadden, James. A History of Uniontown: The County Seat of Fayette County, Pennsylvania. New Werner Co., 1913.
Hassler, Edgar Wakefield. Old Westmoreland: A History of Western Pennsylvania During the Revolution. Kessinger Publishing LLC, 2009.
Heitman, Francis Bernard. Historical Register of Officers of the Continental Army During the War of the Revolution. Washington D.C.: The Rare Book Shop Publishing Co., Inc, 1914.
Historical Society of Pennsylvania. The Constitutional Convention of 1776. Biographical Sketches of Its Members. The Pennsylvania Magazine of History and Biography Vol. IV. 1880.
Klein, Philip S. A History of Pennsylvania. Pennsylvania State University Press, 1976.
Larkin, Jack. Where We Lived: Discovering the Places We Once Called Home. Taunton Press, 2006.
Montgomery, Thomas Lynch. Pennsylvania Archives. Harrisburg: C.E. Aughinbaugh, Printer to the State of Pennsylvania, 1914.
Nelson, Larry L. A Man of Distinction Among Them: Alexander Mckee and British-indian Affairs Along the Ohio Country Frontier, 1754-1799. Kent State University Press, 1980.
Slaughter, Thomas P. The Whiskey Rebellion: Frontier Epilogue to the American Revolution. Oxford University Press, 1988.
Thwaites & Kellogg. Frontier Defense on the Upper Ohio, 1777-1778. State Historical Society of Wisconsin, 1912. Available Online from Google Books.
Thwaites & Kellogg. The Revolution on the Upper Ohio, 1775-1777. State Historical Society of Wisconsin, 1908. Available Online from Google Books.
Veech, James. The Monongahela of Old (Historical Sketches of South-Western Pennsylvania to the Year 1800). Pittsburgh, 1858–1892. Available Online from Google Books
Wallace, Kim E. Thomas Gaddis House (Fort Gaddis), Historic American Buildings Survey - America's Industrial Heritage Project HABS No. PA-5474. National Park Service, 1989. Available Online from the Library of Congress.
Washington, Irvine, & Butterfield. Washington-Irvine Correspondence: The Official Letters Which Passed Between Washington And William Irvine. David Atwood, 1882. Available Online from Google Books

External links
Fort Gaddis - Pennsylvania Historical Markers on Waymarking.com
Excavations at Fort Gaddis, from the California University of Pennsylvania

1742 births
1834 deaths
People excommunicated by Baptist churches
American people of Scotch-Irish descent
Pennsylvania militiamen in the American Revolution
People of the Whiskey Rebellion
People of colonial Pennsylvania
Continental Army officers from Pennsylvania